Centro Sportivo Paraibano, commonly known as CSP, is a Brazilian football club based in João Pessoa, Paraíba state.

History
The club was founded on April 8, 1996. CSP won the Campeonato Paraibano Second Level in 2010.

Achievements
 Campeonato Paraibano Second Level:
 Winners (1): 2010
 Campeonato Paraibano Sub - 15:
 Winners (3): 2010,2011,2012

Stadium

Centro Sportivo Paraibano play their home games at Almeidão. The stadium has a maximum capacity of 40,000 people.

References

External links

Association football clubs established in 1996
Football clubs in Paraíba
1996 establishments in Brazil